Avenue D is the easternmost named avenue in the East Village neighborhood of Manhattan, New York City, east of Avenue C and west of the FDR Drive. It runs through East 13th and Houston Streets, and continues south of Houston Street as Columbia Street until Delancey Street and Abraham E. Kazan Street until its end at Grand Street. Avenues A, B, C and D are the origin of the name of the section of the East Village neighborhood through which they run, Alphabet City.

History

Transportation
Avenue D is served by the M14D bus from East 10th Street to Houston Street (southbound) and Delancey Street (northbound) via Columbia Street.

Structures
Among the structures along this avenue are:

 Dry Dock Park, located at the northern end (11th and Avenue D), a small park with a public pool—named for the neighborhood's former tradition of ship repair. The corner was formerly the site of the Corn Exchange Bank Trust Co.
 Many of the larger Public Housing projects in Alphabet City are on Avenue D. The east side of Avenue D is flanked by the Jacob Riis Houses (NYCHA housing), named for photographer Jacob Riis, who chronicled the plight of the city's poorest residents. The development was designed by Walker & Gillette and was completed in 1949. Other projects include Baruch Houses, LaGuardia Houses, and the Lillian Wald Houses, named for Lillian D. Wald (1867–1940), who provided aid to the Lower East Side through the Henry Street Settlement and the Visiting Nurses Society.
 Between 5th and 6th Streets, east of Avenue D, was formerly the location of the "Boys Brotherhood Republic", a self-governing youth project of the Henry Street Settlement.

References

External links

 New York Songlines: Avenue D, a virtual walking tour

East Village, Manhattan
D